Eupithecia acutipennis is a moth of the family Geometridae first described by George Duryea Hulst in 1898. It is found in the US state of California.

The wingspan is about 22 mm. The forewings are light smoky ocherous. Adults have been recorded on wing from October to April.

References

A
Endemic fauna of California
Moths of North America
Moths described in 1898
Fauna without expected TNC conservation status